Leona, formerly known as Hudson, is an unincorporated community in Douglas County, Oregon, United States. It was named for Leona Perkins. Its post office was established on February 14, 1901 and Thomas E. Bledsoe was its first postmaster.

References

Unincorporated communities in Douglas County, Oregon
1901 establishments in Oregon
Populated places established in 1901
Unincorporated communities in Oregon